Shotor Mel-e Olya-ye Rahmat (also Romanized as Shotor Mel-e ‘Olyā-ye Raḩmat and Shotormal-e ‘Olyā-ye Raḩmat; also called Shotor Mel-e Bālā, Shotor Mol, Shotor Mel, and Shotormāl-e ‘Olyā-ye Hemmat) is a village in Honam Rural District, in the Central District of Selseleh County, Lorestan Province, Iran. At the 2006 census, its population was 165, in 39 families.

References 

Towns and villages in Selseleh County